The Greater Visakhapatnam Municipal Corporation (GVMC) is the civic body that governs the city of Visakhapatnam, largest city of the Indian state of Andhra Pradesh. It is also part of the planning body of the Visakhapatnam Metropolitan Region Development Authority. Established in the year 1979, the executive power of the GVMC is vested in the Municipal Commissioner, an Indian Administrative Service officer appointed by the Government of Andhra Pradesh. The position is held by G. Lakshmisha. Golagani Hari Venkata Kumari (YSRCP) was elected as the Mayor and Jiyyani Sridhar (YSRCP) as the Deputy Mayor by the newly elected general body in March 2021. In January 2021, the number of wards were increased to 98 from 81 earlier.

History
Visakhapatnam is one of the earliest municipalities in the southern region of India. It was first established as a municipality in 1858, later established as a corporation in 1979. On 21 November 2005 Government of Andhra Pradesh released a Government Order to form a Greater Municipal Corporation with the merger of Gajuwaka Municipality and 32 other Gram Panchayats. In the year 2005 it was officially declared as Greater Visakhapatnam Municipal Corporation. and it was the first Greater municipal corporation in the state of Andhra Pradesh. Subsequently in 2017 the Anakapalli and the Bheemili municipalities were incorporated into GVMC raising the wards from 72 to 81 according to the 2011 census.

Administration and about

The area of Greater Visakhapatnam Municipal Corporation is  spread across Visakhapatnam and Anakapalli districts. The corporation is administered by an elected body headed by the mayor.

List of Mayors

Functions 

Visakhapatnam Municipal Corporation is created for the following functions:

 Planning for the town including its surroundings which are covered under its Department's Urban Planning Authority .
 Approving construction of new buildings and authorizing use of land for various purposes.
 Improvement of the town's economic and social status.
 Arrangements of water supply towards commercial, residential, and industrial purposes.
 Planning for fire contingencies through Fire Service Departments.
 Creation of solid waste management, public health system, and sanitary services.
 Working for the development of ecological aspect like development of Urban Forestry and making guidelines for environmental protection.
 Working for the development of weaker sections of the society like mentally and physically disabled, old age and gender biased people.
 Making efforts for improvement of slums and poverty removal in the town.

Revenue sources 

The following are the Income sources for the Corporation from the Central and State Government.

Revenue from taxes 

Following is the Tax related revenue for the corporation.

 Property tax.
 Profession tax.
 Entertainment tax.
 Grants from Central and State Government like Goods and Services Tax.
 Advertisement tax.

Revenue from non-tax sources 

Following is the Non Tax related revenue for the corporation.

 Water usage charges.
 Fees from Documentation services.
 Rent received from municipal property.
 Funds from municipal bonds.

Zones
GVMC is divided by 8 Zones and each Zone had a Zonal Commissioner

Awards and achievements
 Best Municipal Corporation Award by Government of Andhra Pradesh
 Cleanest Religious City Award by India Today (2015)
 Smart Campus Award (2018)
 Basic Services for Urban Poor (BSUP) (2011)
 Smart City Project Award (social aspects) (2018)
 3rd Cleanest City of India by Swachh Survekshan 2017.
 5th Cleanest City of India (2016)
 1st place in Andhra Pradesh Green Awards (2017)

Municipal elections

2021 elections

See also 
List of municipal corporations in Andhra Pradesh

Notes 
The corporation has a total of 95,580 street lights under its administration.

References

External links

Visakhapatnam
1979 establishments in Andhra Pradesh
Government of Visakhapatnam